Apache is a ghost town in Cochise County, Arizona, United States.

History
Apache is the site of the Geronimo Surrender Monument, a memorial dedicated to the site of Geronimo's surrender, and the end of Native American wars in the US.

Apache's population was 38 in 1940, and was 15 in the 1960 census.

Education
Apache is the site of Apache Elementary School, a one-room schoolhouse with an enrollment (in 2017) of eight students as of 2018.

References

Populated places in Cochise County, Arizona